The Violence and Harassment Convention, formally the Convention concerning the elimination of violence and harassment in the world of work is a convention to "recognize the right of everyone to a world of work free from violence and harassment, including gender-based violence and harassment". It is the 190th ILO convention (code C190) and was adopted during the 108th session of the International Labour Organization.

Ratifications
The convention entered into force on 25 June 2021, upon ratification of Fiji and Uruguay. Five other countries (Argentina, Ecuador, Greece, Mauritius, Namibia and Somalia) have deposited their instrument of ratification, but the convention only enters into force 1 year after ratification.
As of 2023, the convention had been ratified by 24 states.

References

External links
 Full text
 Ratifications

2019 in Switzerland
21st century in Geneva
International Labour Organization conventions
Harassment
Workplace
Treaties concluded in 2019
Treaties entered into force in 2021
Treaties of Argentina
Treaties of Ecuador
Treaties of Fiji
Treaties of Mauritius
Treaties of Namibia
Treaties of Somalia
Treaties of Uruguay